San Domenico is a Gothic-style, Roman Catholic church in Pisa, Italy. It was erected in 1385, under the guidance of Pietro Gambacorti, adjacent to a Dominican Convent. Pietro's daughter, the beatified Chiara Gambacorti, resided in that convent.

In 1724 through 1732, the interior was decorated in the ornate late-Baroque style. The church and the adjacent convent were extensively damaged during World War II. It is today in use by the Order of the Knights of Malta.  The interior is decorated by medieval frescoes and canvases by Giovanni Battista Tempesti  depicting the  Life of the beatified Chiara (1782).

The church currently hosts a relic of Blessed Gerard, the founder of the Order of Malta.

Gallery

References 

Domenico
Gothic architecture in Pisa
14th-century Roman Catholic church buildings in Italy